Karl-Heinz Werner (born 17 September 1949) is a German judoka. He competed in the men's lightweight event at the 1972 Summer Olympics.

References

1949 births
Living people
People from Rodewisch
German male judoka
Sportspeople from Saxony
Olympic judoka of East Germany
Judoka at the 1972 Summer Olympics